A legislature plebiscite was held in 1937 to decide whether or not women could vote. Multiple women's movements started in 1910, which led to the plebiscite in 1937 where women voted for or against for women's suffrage rights. Filipino women worked hard to mobilize and fight for women's suffrage in the early 1900s and gained victory after 447,725 out of 500,000 votes affirmed to having women's right to vote.

Counter arguments against women gaining the right to vote in the Philippines were stated due to the fact that it would ruin family unity, giving less power to the husband or man of the house in the family.

Prior to the plebiscite, electors voted on the approval of the new Philippine constitution. Approximately 1,213,934 of the electors voted in favor of the new constitution while 42,690 electors voted against. The new constitution, which contains a provision for the mechanism of extending the right to vote to women, was also the shortest constitution that was ratified during modern times. This new constitution contained only a small number of 17 articles.

Before women gained the right to vote, they had no legal rights during that time period. Even with the proper consent from their husbands, women still could not obtain any legal rights. Governor General Dwight F. Davis made it legal for women to have some legal rights when it came to disposition of property. This allowed for women to own personal items within their marriage. The issue concerning women's suffrage in the Philippines was settled in a special plebiscite held on 30 April 1937. Ninety percent of voters were in favor of the measure.

Background 

In the beginning of the 20th century, various women's rights groups emerged shortly after the United States gained sovereignty over the Philippines. In 1905, the Asociacion Feminista Filipina (Feminist Association of the Philippines) was founded by Concepcion Felix Rodriguez along with 12 elite women. A year later, in 1906, women's rights pioneer Pura Villanueva Kalaw founded the Asociacion Feminista Ilonga; its goal was to focus on women's suffrage. Both of these organizations not only helped the suffrage movement, they were also one of the first organizations that built a foundation for the suffrage movement in the Philippines. The objectives of the organizations were to touch upon socio-civic matters some of which were prison reform, improving the education system and healthcare and labor reforms. 

Governor General Frank Murphy was the first governor to take action on gaining civil and political rights for women, while other governors such as Dwight F. Davis aimed to help women gain civil rights, but never took initiative. Murphy, who aimed to gain peace and unity for all Philippine women, ultimately signed the Woman's Suffrage Bill, in hope that women would gain equal rights, fairness, and treatment.

Several feminist organizations played a role in enhancing the suffrage movement. At the same time, there was an all-male National Legislature that was against the feminist movement, thus did not support the movement because they feared that traditional family roles would start to change if women had the right to vote. Those who were opposed to the women's suffrage movement were not only men but also women. 

In 1920, the Manila Women's Club emerged as the "next big step" toward forming the League of Women's Suffragettes, which worked toward women's right to vote. The club formed the League of Women's Suffragettes. A year after the League of Women's Suffragettes was formed, there was another organization called the National Federation of Women's Club in 1921–1937, which was known to be the vanguard of the suffrage movement.

Legislation and plebiscite
In 1934, the 1935 constitution was approved. Article 5 of the constitution stated that "The National Assembly shall extend the right of suffrage to women, if in a plebiscite which shall be held for that purpose within two years after the adoption of this Constitution, not less than three hundred thousand women possessing the necessary qualifications shall vote affirmatively on the question". 

In response, Filipino women amped up their mobilization women to vote. There was widespread propaganda through media, posters, press, radio, house to house visits and such and they also had lectures informing women about the plebiscite. The Junior Federation of Women's Club was also created to help women with children so that they were able to vote while their children would be taken care of. Transportation and food were provided, creating less hassle for Filipinos that may or may not have financial abilities to go out and vote. 

The National Assembly passed Commonwealth Act No. 34 which was approved on 30 September 1936; the act provided for the holding of the plebiscite for women's suffrage the following year. As mandated by Commonwealth Act No. 34, women who met the same qualification as men would be qualifies to vote in the plebiscite. 

Voters were asked the following:

In English:

In Spanish:

Out of the total of 500,000 women that voted in 30 April 1937, 447,725 women voted in favor of extending the right to vote to women while 52,275 voted against. 

As a result of the majority of affirmative votes cast, the right of suffrage was extended to women, in compliance with section 10 of Commonwealth Act No. 34.

Plebiscite results

Rules: In order to be approved, there should be 300,000 or more "Yes" votes.

Legacy
The Philippines is one of the earliest countries in Southeast Asia to have a female president, Corazon Aquino, who was in office from 25 February 1986 to 30 June 1992; the country also has high percentages of women participation in the political realm. The current 1987 Constitution grants equality for both men and women. Some of the equal political rights are the right of suffrage, the right to run for public service, right to political expression, and the right to information. The Philippines is one of the countries that is a signatory to the United Nations Convention on the Political Rights of Women (CEDAW). In 1939, two years after Philippine women were granted the right to vote, the first woman senator was elected: Geronima T. Pecson. The election of Pecson sparked the start of many leadership positions for women such as the election of two women presidents, three vice presidents, congresswomen, senators, mayors and many other leadership positions along with those.

See also
 Commission on Elections
 Politics of the Philippines
 Philippine elections
 Suffrage

References

External links
 Commonwealth Act No. 34 via the Supreme Court E-Library

1937 referendums
1937 in the Philippines
Women's suffrage in the Philippines
Suffrage referendums
Presidency of Manuel L. Quezon
1937 in women's history
Referendums in the Philippines